Françoise in Italian is a compilation album by the French popular singer Françoise Hardy where all songs are in Italian language. This compilation was only published in South Africa in 1970 under label World Record Co. It contains ten titles published in singles under Italian label Compagnia Generale del Disco, of 1968 to 1970.

From Italy towards South Africa 
Since the publication of its first album in Italian language, Françoise Hardy recorded many singles in this language which was not the object of any other album but was only disseminated in various Italian compilations.
In 1968, when the singer changed distributive firm into Italy, a dozen titles were recorded until 1970 but no album published if it is not a compilation half in French half in Italian where five Italian titles appeared. It’s only at the end of its contract with this firm and after having broken with Vogue, that Hardy made this compilation, produces by Hypopotam, his society create in 1970. However, this compilation does not gather that ten songs This compilation It was only distributed in South Africa, country where its discs were sold well and where it received a beautiful reception at the tour time that it had carried out there from February 26 to March 16, 1968.

Compilation’s track listing

References 

Françoise Hardy albums
1970 compilation albums